Société Générale Twin Towers are two office skyscrapers located in La Défense, a high-rise business district, and in Nanterre, France, west of Paris. Their exterior designs are identical.

The towers were built and opened in 1995 to become the head office of the Société Générale, one of France's largest banking groups. Before the twin towers were constructed, Société Générale's headquarters were located in Paris.

Features 
The roof and structural height of both towers is at 167 m (548 ft) above ground. The roofs of the towers are sharply inclined.

The towers were the tallest skyscrapers built in La Défense since the Tour Total in 1985. It was one of the first buildings in France to receive the High Quality Environmental standard label.

The northern tower is named tour Alicante and the southern one tour Chassagne. In its interior design, Chassagne is decorated with white stone from the village of Chassagne in Auvergne, whereas Alicante is decorated with red marble from Alicante in Spain. Both towers share the same platform and stand about 40 m (130 ft) apart. 

Despite the large office space available in the current twin towers, Société Générale needed yet more space and so it launched the construction of a third skyscraper, the 183 m (600 ft) tall Tour Granite, which stands immediately behind the twin towers and was opened in 2008.

See also 

 Skyscraper
 La Défense
 List of tallest structures in Paris

References

External links 
 Tours Société Générale (Emporis)

Societe Generale
Societe Generale
Twin towers
Société Générale
Office buildings completed in 1995
Buildings and structures completed in 1995